Sadlno  is a former village in the administrative district of Gmina Ząbkowice Śląskie, within Ząbkowice Śląskie County, Lower Silesian Voivodeship, in south-western Poland. Now it is a south-eastern part of Ząbkowice Śląskie bearing the status of sołectwo.

At its origin, Sadlno was a Slavic trading settlement located on the Amber Road and mentioned in records as early as in 1207. Later, Ząbkowice Śląskie were founded next to Sadlno.

Its most prominent monument is the baroque Saint Hedwig of Andechs Church.

References

Sadlno